Pince (in older sources also Pinica) is a settlement southeast of Lendava in the Prekmurje region of Slovenia. It lies close to the extreme eastern point of Slovenia, right on the border with Hungary.

Name
The Slovene name Pince is borrowed from the Hungarian name of the village (which itself was borrowed from Slovene) and has replaced the older Slovene name Pinica. The name derives from the Slovene common noun pivnica, which means 'wine cellar' in the local dialect, via the development *Pivьnica > *Pivnice > *Pinice > *Pince.

References

External links
Pince on Geopedia

Populated places in the Municipality of Lendava
Hungary–Slovenia border crossings